Gregory Joshue Echenique Carrillo (born November 20, 1990) is a Venezuelan professional basketball player for the Fukushima Firebonds of the Japanese B.League.

College career
Echenique played college basketball at Rutgers University, with the Rutgers Scarlet Knights from 2008 to 2009, and at Creighton University, with the Creighton Bluejays, from 2010 to 2013.

Professional career
After going undrafted in the 2013 NBA Draft, Echenique signed with the German team MHP Riesen Ludwigsburg, that played in the Basketball Bundesliga. He was cut by the team in December 2013, after playing 10 games with the team.

In January 2014, he signed a two-month contract with Belgian club Telenet Oostende, the defending Belgian League champion. After this period his contract was extended until the end of the season. He re-signed with Oostende in August 2014 until December 27, 2014. A day later, he signed with Venezuelan team Guaros de Lara.

He won the 2016 FIBA Americas League championship and the 2016 edition of the FIBA Intercontinental Cup championship with Guaros de Lara. On September 23, 2018, Echenique inked with Shimane Susanoo Magic of the Japanese B.League.

National team career
Echenique is a member of the senior men's Venezuelan national basketball team. He played with Venezuela at the following tournaments: the 2009 FIBA Americas Championship, the 2011 FIBA Americas Championship, the 2012 South American Championship, where he won a silver medal, the 2012 FIBA World Olympic Qualifying Tournament, the 2015 Pan American Games, and the 2016 South American Championship, where he won a gold medal.

He also played at the 2016 Summer Olympics.

References

External links
Twitter Account
FIBA Profile
EuroCup Profile
Eurobasket.com profile
Draft Express.com profile

1990 births
Living people
Basketball players at the 2015 Pan American Games
Basketball players at the 2016 Summer Olympics
BC Oostende players
Centers (basketball)
Creighton Bluejays men's basketball players
Guaros de Lara (basketball) players
Hiroshima Dragonflies players
Olympic basketball players of Venezuela
Pan American Games competitors for Venezuela
People from Miranda (state)
People from Guatire
Power forwards (basketball)
Riesen Ludwigsburg players
Rutgers Scarlet Knights men's basketball players
Shimane Susanoo Magic players
Basketball players from Newark, New Jersey
St. Benedict's Preparatory School alumni
Venezuelan expatriate basketball people in Belgium
Venezuelan expatriate basketball people in Germany
Venezuelan expatriate basketball people in Japan
Venezuelan expatriate basketball people in the United States
Venezuelan men's basketball players